Alida "Alie" Johanna van den Bos (18 January 1902, in Amsterdam – 16 July 2003, in Amsterdam) was a Dutch gymnast who competed in the 1928 Summer Olympics.

In 1928 she won the gold medal as member of the Dutch gymnastics team.

Van den Bos died in 2003 at age 101, she was the last person of the Dutch Team at the 1928 Amsterdam Olympics to die, most majority of 1928 Dutch team was murdered by Nazi German SS military officials in the Sobibor concentration camp in the Holocaust.

References
 Alida van den Bos' profile at databaseOlympics
 Obituary at the International Society of Olympic Historians

1902 births
2003 deaths
Dutch centenarians
Dutch female artistic gymnasts
Gymnasts at the 1928 Summer Olympics
Olympic gold medalists for the Netherlands
Olympic gymnasts of the Netherlands
Gymnasts from Amsterdam
Olympic medalists in gymnastics
Recipients of the Olympic Order
Medalists at the 1928 Summer Olympics
Women centenarians
20th-century Dutch women
20th-century Dutch people
21st-century Dutch women